Kings Worthy is a village and civil parish in Hampshire, England, approximately two miles north-east of Winchester. Kings Worthy was a tithing of Barton Stacey when the Domesday Book was written.

St Mary's church
The parish church, built in 1864, is found on London Road. A traditional village church, St Mary's caters to a range of worshippers from Anglo-Catholics to those of a more evangelical persuasion. The church is welcoming to families, with a dedicated room for younger children, known as the Little Fishes room. A highlight of the church calendar is the Festival of Nine Lessons and Carols. This celebration of Christmas follows a traditional format with a wide selection of choir items, congregational carols and readings.

Education

The primary school is Kings Worthy Primary School. Most pupils from Kings Worthy Primary go on to study at Henry Beaufort School.

Sports within Kingsworthy are limited, however the Worthys Football club were runners up in the 2017 Jack West cup Final. Steve Brine (local MP) offered support saying "up the worthys".

Primary school

Kings Worthy Primary School is a medium-sized school in the heart of Kings Worthy, Winchester, England. It has around 420 pupils and 25 staff. It is a state school for pupils aged from 4–11. At the school, pupils finish by taking their year six SATS exams.

The School was established in 1953. It was originally one of two schools with the other being in Abbot's Worthy. As the school started to grow they bought Hinton House. this is an old Victorian house situated adjacent to the school site. this was then used to house five classrooms.

In September 2008 Hinton House was sold and work began on a brand new building consisting of five new modern classrooms. this also included purpose built technology rooms. During this move some of the schools grounds were lost but they still have a wide area including a pond and a big sports field.

Every year the school puts on a spectacular Christmas production that involves everyone in the school and each class comes on and does their own little sketch. Every year the show is different but it always links in or around the Christmas story.

Theatre
The Jubilee Hall on London Road is home to amateur dramatics group, The Worthy Players, who have been treading the boards in the village since 1973. A versatile group, the Players have performed pantomimes, comedies, farces, thrillers, music hall, serious plays and much more over more than 40 years.

Transportation
The main road (Springvale Road) is fairly busy, and is served by regular buses going to the centre of Winchester. The main bus route serving the village is known as "The Spring", and is operated by Stagecoach. The parish is crossed by the A33, which merges with the A34 immediately to the south. Kings Worthy formerly had a station on the Didcot, Newbury and Southampton Railway. It was by-passed to the west by the London and South Western Railway (the surviving main line) and to the north by the Alton, Alresford and Winchester Railway, part of which survives to the east as the Watercress Line.

Conservation
Worthys Conservation Volunteers is the local group of practical conservationists working on the third Sunday of each month to care for the wildlife and natural environment in and around the village and The Worthys.

Representation
Cllr Jackie Porter, Cllr Malcolm Prince and Cllr Jane Rutter (all Liberal Democrats) represent The Worthys ward on Winchester City Council.

Further reading
 Anon The Kings Worthy Panel (available from the church)
 Johnston, David Saints and Pilgrims: The Story of St. Mary's Church, Kings Worthy 2009
 Johnston, David Every Window Tells a Story (Fuller account of St. Mary's Church stained glass windows)
 Hawkes, Sonia Chadwick; Grainger, Guy; Biddulph E.; Dodd, Anne The Anglo-Saxon Cemetery at Worthy Park, Kingsworthy, near Winchester, Hampshire 2003

References

External links

 Kings Worthy Parish Council

Villages in Hampshire